Mexico hosted the 2011 Pan American Games in Guadalajara, Mexico from October 14 to 30, 2011. Mexico has competed in every edition of the Pan American Games since the first games held in Buenos Aires, Argentina. Mexico began their participation having achieved 782 medals in total with 155 of them gold. On August 24, 2011, the head of CONADE, Bernardo de la Garza stated that the Mexican athletes would look to break the country's historic record of achieving 23 gold medals in a single Games, which happened at the 1995 Pan American Games in Mar del Plata, Argentina. For that specific objective, the Mexican delegation has landed its hopes on the disciplines of diving, taekwondo, archery, racquetball, basque pelota, and athletics, most specifically in the athletes: Paola Espinosa, Paola Longoria, Alberto Rodríguez, Eder Sánchez, Damián Villa, Yahel Castillo, and Juan René Serrano (flagbearer), who are the strongest possibilities of winning a gold medal in their respective disciplines.

The Mexican Olympic Committee (COM) announced that the Mexican delegation would be made by 646 athletes, 279 of them women and 367 men, who will participate in all 36 sports. On September 20, 2011, the COM announced that the Mexican archer Juan René Serrano would be the flagbearer. On a protocolary ceremony held on September 23, 2011, the Mexican president Felipe Calderón made the official handing of the national flag to the archer, encouraging both pan American and parapan American athletes to give their best effort at the games.

Medalists

References 

2011
Nations at the 2011 Pan American Games
P